Valery Olegovich Alshansky (born 20 June 1995) is a Russian football player. He plays for FC SKA Rostov-on-Don.

Club career
He made his debut in the Russian Football National League for FC Tekstilshchik Ivanovo on 12 August 2020 in a game against FC Chayka Peschanokopskoye.

References

External links
 
 Profile by Russian Football National League
 

1995 births
Sportspeople from Rostov-on-Don
Living people
Russian footballers
Russia youth international footballers
Association football forwards
FC Krasnodar-2 players
FC Arsenal Tula players
FC SKA Rostov-on-Don players
FC Saturn Ramenskoye players
FC Tekstilshchik Ivanovo players
FC Zvezda Perm players
Russian First League players
Russian Second League players